66th New York Film Critics Circle Awards
January 14, 2001

Best Picture:
 Traffic 

The 66th New York Film Critics Circle Awards, honoring the best in film for 2000, were announced on 13 December 2000 and presented on 14 January 2001 by the New York Film Critics Circle.

Winners

Best Actor:
Tom Hanks – Cast Away
Runners-up: Benicio del Toro – Traffic and Javier Bardem – Before Night Falls
Best Actress:
Laura Linney – You Can Count on Me
Runners-up: Gillian Anderson – The House of Mirth and Björk – Dancer in the Dark
Best Animated Film:
Chicken Run
Best Cinematography:
Peter Pau – Crouching Tiger, Hidden Dragon (Wo hu cang long)
Best Director:
Steven Soderbergh – Erin Brockovich and Traffic
Runners-up: Ang Lee – Crouching Tiger, Hidden Dragon (Wo hu cang long) and Terence Davies – The House of Mirth
Best Film:
Traffic
Runners-up: Crouching Tiger, Hidden Dragon (Wo hu cang long) and The House of Mirth
Best First Film:
David Gordon Green – George Washington
Best Foreign Language Film:
Yi Yi • Taiwan/Japan
Runner-up: Crouching Tiger, Hidden Dragon (Wo hu cang long) • Taiwan/Japan/United States/China
Best Non-Fiction Film:
The Life and Times of Hank Greenberg
Best Screenplay:
Kenneth Lonergan – You Can Count on Me
Best Supporting Actor:
Benicio del Toro – Traffic
Runners-up: Willem Dafoe – Shadow of the Vampire and Fred Willard – Best in Show
Best Supporting Actress:
Marcia Gay Harden – Pollock
Runners-up: Frances McDormand – Almost Famous and Ellen Burstyn – Requiem for a Dream
Special Awards:
Rialto Pictures, for the re-release of Jules Dassin's Rififi
The Shooting Gallery, for their ingenious distribution pattern as well as their choice of films

References

External links
 2000 Awards

2000
New York Film Critics Circle Awards
2000 in American cinema
New
New York